Pseudodaphnella daedala is a species of sea snail, a marine gastropod mollusk in the family Raphitomidae.

Description
The length of the shell attains 10 mm.

The whorls are rounded or very slightly shouldered, reticulated by longitudinal and revolving fine ribs and lines. The shell is yellowish brown, tinged with chestnut, sometimes forming an indistinct central band. (described as Mangilia margaritifera, Gray)

Distribution
This marine species is endemic to Australia and occurs off the Gulf of Carpentaria to Queensland, Australia; it also occurs off the Fiji Islands and Singapore.

References

 Reeve, L.A. 1846. Monograph of the genus Pleurotoma. pls 34–40 in Reeve, L.A. (ed). Conchologia Iconica. London : L. Reeve & Co. Vol. 1
 Brazier, J. 1876. A list of the Pleurotomidae collected during the Chevert expedition, with the description of the new species. Proceedings of the Linnean Society of New South Wales 1: 151–162

External links
 
 Gastropods.com: Pseudodaphnella daedala
  Hedley, C. 1922. A revision of the Australian Turridae. Records of the Australian Museum 13(6): 213–359, pls 42–56 
 ANSP, Philadelphia: Pseudodaphnella daedalea Garrett 1873

daedala
Gastropods described in 1846
Gastropods of Australia